Virahya Pattarachokchai (born March 24, 1992), is a Thai actress and model, who was the runner-up of the second season and the winner of the fourth season of The Face Thailand.

Early life and education
Pattarachokchai was born in Ratchaburi, Thailand. She is of Chinese, Thai and Turkish descent. She graduated from the Sacred Heart Convent School and received a bachelor's degree in Communication Arts from Rangsit University.

Career
She entered the entertainment industry through modeling, starting her career in 2011 as a contestant in Thai Supermodel Contest 2011, where she was placed in Top 10 and won Body Perfect Award. 

In 2016, she joined The Face Thailand (season 2) as one of the contestants of Team Lukkade and she was runner-up with Wanpiya Ormsinnoppakul and signed a contract with Kantana. 

In 2018, she joined The Face Thailand (season 4) as one of the contestants of Team Cris and Lukkade and she won the competition. 

In 2019, she became a mentor of The Face Thailand (season 5) with Toni Rakkaen, Maria Poonlertlarp and Bank Anusith.

Filmography

TV dramas
 PatiHarn Rak Kham Khobfa (ปาฏิหาริย์รักข้ามขอบฟ้า) (CH3, 2015)
 Rak Rai (รักร้าย) (CH3, 2017)
 Wang Nang Hong (วังนางโหง) (CH7, 2017)
 Ngern Pak Phee (เงินปากผี) (CH3, 2018) (Invited actor)
 Thin Phu Dee (ถิ่นผู้ดี) (CH7, 2018) (First Villain)
 Rang Tearn (แรงเทียน) (CHGMM25, 2019) (Villain)

Music Video
 Phiang Nueng Khrang (เพียงหนึ่งครั้ง) (2015) - The Yers 
 Thee Jing Rao Mai Dai Rak Kan (ที่จริงเราไม่ได้รักกัน) (2016) - Mild

Awards

References

External links

Virahya Pattarachokchai
Living people
1992 births
Virahya Pattarachokchai
Virahya Pattarachokchai
Virahya Pattarachokchai
Virahya Pattarachokchai
Virahya Pattarachokchai
Virahya Pattarachokchai